Baldwin Farm Area High School, formerly known as Farm Area Primary School, is a senior secondary, co-educational, English medium school located in Kadma, Jamshedpur, Jharkhand, India. It is affiliated to the Central Board of Secondary Education, New Delhi, and managed by Baldwin Academy Society. The school was established by Tata Steel (known as TISCO at the time) and outsourced to Baldwin Academy Society, Patna in 2003. The principal of the school is Subhoshree Sarkar.

Administration 
 Principal - Dr. Subhoshree Sarkar

References

External links 
 Official website

High schools and secondary schools in Jharkhand
Schools in Jharkhand